Oxya is a genus of grasshoppers (Caelifera: Acrididae) found in Africa and Asia (where some species may be called "rice grasshoppers").

Species
The Orthoptera Species File lists the following:

Gallery

References

External links
 
 

 
Acrididae genera